The Rose That Grew from Concrete (1999) is a collection of poetry written between 1989 and 1991 by Tupac Shakur, published by Pocket Books through its MTV Books imprint. A preface was written by Shakur's mother Afeni Shakur, a foreword by Nikki Giovanni and an introduction by his manager, Leila Steinberg.

Table of contents
 Acknowledgments
 Preface by Afeni Shakur
 Foreword: Tupac, C U in Heaven by Nikki Giovanni
 Introduction by Leila Steinberg

Nothing Can Come Between Us
 Nothing Can Come Between Us
 My Dearest One!!
 If There Be Pain...
 Things That Make Hearts Break
 Black Woman
 And Still I Love U
 The Mutual Heartache?
 1st Impressions
 A Love Unspoken
 Forever and Today
 When I Do Kiss U
 Carmencita of the Bronx!
 Untitled
 Love Is Just Complicated
 Elizabeth
 I Know My Heart Has Lied Before
 From First Glance
 1 for April
 Wife 4 Life
 Tears from a Star
 March 1 — The Day After April
 Why Must U Be Unfaithful
 The Power of a Smile
 Genesis (The Rebirth of My Heart)
 Love Within a Storm
 What Can I Offer Her?
 Jada
 The Tears in Cupid's Eyes
 Cupid's Smile II
 What I See!
 In the Midst of Passion
 2 People with 1 Wish
 Hours Pass By

Just a Breath of Freedom
 Just a Breath of Freedom
 For Mrs. Hawkins
 The Sun and the Moon
 "Fallen Star"
 Government Assistance or My Soul
 Family Tree
 Or My Soul
 When Your Hero Falls
 Untitled
 "U R Ripping Us Apart!!!"
 A River That Flows Forever
 Can U C the Pride in the Panther
 Tears of a Teenage Mother
 "Where There Is a Will..."

Liberty Needs Glasses
 Liberty Needs Glasses
 How Can We Be Free
 The Promise
 And 2morrow
 No-Win
 The Unanswerable?
 Nightmares
 So I Say GOODBYE
 In the Event of My Demise

References

1999 poetry books
American poetry collections
Tupac Shakur